Head Over Heels is a 1937 British musical film directed by Sonnie Hale and starring Jessie Matthews, Robert Flemyng and Louis Borel. It was released in the U.S. as Head over Heels in Love.

Production
The film was made at the Lime Grove Studios in London with sets designed by Alfred Junge. It was based on the play Pierre ou Jack by Francis de Croisset (Paris, 1931).

Plot
In Paris, nightclub entertainer Jeanne (Jessie Matthews) falls in love with her dance partner, the idle, womanising Marcel (Louis Borel). When Marcel runs off with rich and glamorous film star Norma (Helen Whitney Bourne), Jeanne's true love Pierre (Robert Flemyng) comes to her aid, and helps find her work on the radio. After becoming a successful radio star, Jeanne becomes attractive once more to Marcel, but the faithful Pierre cannot risk losing her again.

Cast
 Jessie Matthews as Jeanne Colbert
 Robert Flemyng as Pierre
 Louis Borel as Marcel Larimour
 Romney Brent as Matty
 Whitney Bourne as Norma Langtry
 Paul Leyssac as Max
 Eliot Makeham as Martin
 Fred Duprez as Norma's manager
 Edward Cooper as Charles

Critical reception
Writing for The Spectator in 1937, Graham Greene gave the film a poor review, characterizing it as "a moribund tale of poor young people with ambitions in Parisian garrets". Greene concludes that the film is one of the "worst English film[s] of the quarter".

The Radio Times wrote, "Having made her movie name under the direction of Victor Saville, Jessie Matthews went to work for her four-time co-star and then husband Sonnie Hale, whose first outing behind the camera this was," but concluded, "Hale's inexperience shows away from the musical numbers. But it's engaging enough, and Alfred Junge's sets give the film a sophistication too often missing from British musicals of the period"; while Allmovie wrote, "Legendary British musical-comedy favorite Jessie Matthews chalks up another winner."

References

Bibliography
 Low, Rachael. Filmmaking in 1930s Britain. George Allen & Unwin, 1985.
 Wood, Linda. British Films, 1927-1939. British Film Institute, 1986.

External links

1937 films
British romantic comedy films
British musical comedy films
1937 romantic comedy films
1937 musical comedy films
Films based on works by Francis de Croisset
Films directed by Sonnie Hale
Films shot at Lime Grove Studios
British films based on plays
British romantic musical films
Films set in Paris
British black-and-white films
1930s romantic musical films
1930s English-language films
1930s British films